"My Heart Will Never Know" is a song written by Steve Dorff and Billy Kirsch, and recorded by American country music artist Clay Walker.  It was released in May 1995 as the third and final single from his album If I Could Make a Living.  It peaked at number 16 in the United States and number 6 in Canada.

Critical reception
Larry Flick of Billboard gave the song a positive review writing "One of the brightest stars in country music's new wave, Walker is batting 1.000 at radio. He delivers one of his best-ever vocal performances, conveying all the heartbreak of this well-written ballad's lyric." Sonia Murray of the Atlanta Constitution wrote "My Heart Will Never Know," has enough pop inflection to make it appealing to young listeners who grew up on recent rock 'n' roll. They'll also grab concertgoers who've switched from rock to country as they've grown older.

Music video
The music video was directed by Bill Young and premiered in mid-1995.

Chart positions
"My Heart Will Never Know" debuted at number 66 on the U.S. Billboard Hot Country Singles & Tracks for the week of May 6, 1995.

Charts

References

1995 singles
1994 songs
Clay Walker songs
Songs written by Steve Dorff
Song recordings produced by James Stroud
Giant Records (Warner) singles
Songs written by Billy Kirsch